Tyne and Wear PTE, branded as Nexus, is an executive body of the North East Joint Transport Committee and is best known for owning and operating the Tyne and Wear Metro. It replaced the Tyneside PTE on 1 April 1974.

Operations
TWPTE is responsible for the following aspects of the Tyne and Wear public transport system:

owning, operating and maintaining the Tyne and Wear Metro;
owning, operating and maintaining the Shields Ferry;
coordinating local bus services;
contracting and subsidising unprofitable but socially necessary bus services, including school buses;
subsidising local heavy rail services between Newcastle and Sunderland;
administering the concessionary travel scheme for older people and eligible disabled adults and children
subsidising public transport for children aged under 16 and further education students
providing public transport information;
maintaining bus stops and most bus stations.
running Taxicard, a subsidised taxi service for disabled people

Policies and programmes
Nexus is pursuing a number of major programmes aimed at improving public transport in Tyne and Wear. These include the £389 million "Metro: All Change" programme to modernise the Tyne and Wear Metro over eleven years. Most of the capital money will be invested in renewal and upgrade of infrastructure, with modernisation of stations and trains also included. Trains will not be replaced within this programme, but are expected to be replaced in around 2023.

In April 2009 Nexus launched a Bus Strategy aimed at improving the bus network in Tyne and Wear, which accounts for around 77% of all public transport journeys in the area. Nexus said it wished to work in partnership with commercial bus companies which operate 90% of services in Tyne and Wear. Priorities include increasing the punctuality and reliability of bus services, improving information and ensuring the network offers a high level of access to local shops, services and workplaces.  In October 2014 the North East Combined Authority accepted a recommendation from Nexus to take forward a Quality Contracts Scheme as the best means of meeting this objective.

Nexus seeks to reduce social exclusion, particularly for disabled people, through a number of overlapping schemes. These include subsidised taxis, weekly community bus services between sheltered accommodation and supermarkets, a "companion card" allowing free use of public transport by caretakers, and specialist training and mentoring for people with learning difficulties.

Smart ticketing

Nexus has led one of the UK's biggest roll-outs of smart ticketing technology, in partnership with local councils and commercial transport companies as part of the North East Smart Ticketing Initiative (NESTI). NESTI aims to deliver a single smart infrastructure for North East England, making it possible to travel on public transport with a single smart payment card. Nexus has itself launched the Pop brand, which encompasses a number of smartcards including Pop cards for season tickets, Pop Pay As You Go cards and Under 16 Pop cards which facilitate concessionary travel by young people in Tyne and Wear. Pop branded smartcards are accepted and are commonplace on Nexus' services, while the Pop PAYG card is accepted on a range of public transport across North East England.

Nexus have also introduced Pop PAYG for Google Pay, allowing users with Android smartphones to use Google Pay instead of a Physical Pop card. However, existing cards are unable to be added, requiring a new card be created via the App.

TravelShops

Nexus operated six TravelShops which sold tickets and provided local public transport information. These were located at:

Central Station Metro station, Newcastle
Gateshead Interchange
Haymarket Metro station, Newcastle
North Shields Metro station
Park Lane Interchange, Sunderland
South Shields Interchange

Following the coronavirus outbreak all of the shops were closed and staff were redeployed to assist at bus and Metro stations.

References

External links

Map of Tyne and Wear zones

 
Transport in Tyne and Wear
Local government in Tyne and Wear
Public transport executives in the United Kingdom
Companies owned by municipalities of England